The Pedro's Cup is a biannual athletics event of two legs, which features an indoor track and field competition in January or February and an outdoor competition during the European summer period. The first competition of each year since 2005 has taken place in Bydgoszcz, Poland. The second competition of each year has taken place in another city, currently Poznan, Warsaw and Szczecin have hosted the summer/autumn Pedro's cup competition. The event typically draws top level competition, including at least fifteen Olympic medalists in 2008 and more in 2009. The meet is unique because it draws best athletes of the world to compete in a rather cold climate.

At the 2008 event, Asafa Powell became the first sprinter to turn in a sub-10 second 100 metres time in Poland, and in 2009, he equalled the meet record of 9.82 seconds. The 2010 indoor event featured only three events (pole vault, shot put and high jump) but Anna Rogowska provided a record-breaking performance by vaulting 4.81 m and beating the previous Polish best mark.

Finals

Results

2005
The 2005 Pedro's Cup indoor competition was held in Bydgoszcz on 26 January 2005. This was the first time the competition had taken place.

2006
The 2006 Pedro's Cup indoor competition was held in Bydgoszcz on 25 January 2006.

2007
The 2007 Pedro's Cup indoor competition was held in Bydgoszcz on 14 February 2007.

2008
The 2008 Pedro's Cup indoor competition was held in Bydgoszcz on 20 February 2008.

2009
The 2009 Pedro's Cup indoor competition was held in Bydgoszcz, 10 February 2009. This competition featured men's shot put for the first time.

Meeting records (indoor)

Men

Women

References

External links
 Pedro's Cup web site
 Forsport

 
Annual track and field meetings
Athletics competitions in Poland
Sport in Bydgoszcz
Annual indoor track and field meetings
2005 establishments in Poland
Recurring sporting events established in 2005